Rantis is a Palestinian town in the West Bank, located in the northwestern Ramallah and al-Bireh Governorate, 33 kilometers northwest of Ramallah. According to the Palestinian Central Bureau of Statistics, it had a population of 2,900 in mid-year 2006. Its population consists primarily of six clans: Danoun, Wahdan, Khallaf, Ballot, Dar Abo Salim, al-Ryahee and Hawashe.

Rantis has a land area 11,046 dunams of which 589 dunams are built-up area.    The town's main economic sector is agriculture and 20% of its land area is planted with crops. There are two primary schools and two kindergartens. Other facilities include three clinics, a bus station, a club and two 
mosques.

Location
Rantis is  located  22.2 km northwest of Ramallah. It is bordered by Al Lubban al Gharbi  and Abud land to the east, Al Lubban al Gharbi village land to the north, Israel to the west and Shuqba to the south.

History
In a nearby cave, flint artefacts have been found, possibly produced during the  Middle Paleolithic period, occasionally by the Levallois technique.

Each of the Gospels mention this town as Arimathea once, and always in association with Joseph of Arimathea — who placed Christ's body in his own tomb.  Both Eusebius and Jerome identify Arimathea with the birthplace of Samuel. In the 4th century, Jerome reported that Saint Paula visited this location. Strong traditions from the Middle Ages buttress this claim, celebrating this town as the prophet's original home. A monastery of Joseph of Arimathea was erected there. Conflicting traditions urge Arimathea's location at modern Rantis, 15 miles east of Jaffa. Other suggestions for Arimathea include ar-Ram and al-Bireh-Ramallah, 5 and 8 miles north of Jerusalem, respectively.
The Survey of Western Palestine assumed the village was "ancient", as rock-cut tombs were found south-west of the village.

Archaeological excavation have uncovered sherds from the Iron Age and Persian era, in addition to remains of a road and a building from the Roman era. A building, probably dating to the Byzantine era has also been excavated.

Crusader  era
During the Crusader era, it was known as Arimathia, Arimatie, Abarimatie, and Rantis. By 1150, the Premonstratensians were represented in Rentis with a house. In 1159-60 a church in the village was mentioned in Crusader sources.

In 1187 Rantis was conquered by Saladin, and the Crusaders were never able to return.

Ottoman era
Rantis was incorporated into the Ottoman Empire in 1517 with all of Palestine, and in 1596 it appeared in the tax registers as being in the Nahiya of Jabal Qubal of the Liwa of Nablus. It had a population of 20 households and 2 batchelors, all Muslim. The villagers paid a fixed tax-rate of 33.3% on agricultural products, including wheat, barley, summer crops, olive trees, goats and/or beehives, and a press for olives or grapes; a total of 2,500 Akçe. In 1838, Edward Robinson noted it as a village, Rentis, in the Jurat Merda district, south of Nablus.

The French explorer Victor Guérin visited the village in 1870, and found that it had 400 inhabitants, and that it was surrounded by olives and tobacco-plantations.

In 1882 the PEF's Survey of Western Palestine (SWP) described Rantis as a village, principally made of adobe, on a slope, surrounded by open ground and a few olives. Water was supplied by cisterns. The SWP assumed the village was "ancient", as rock-cut tombs were found there.

British Mandate era
In the 1922 census of Palestine conducted by the British Mandate authorities, Rantis had a population of 824 inhabitants, all Muslims,  increasing in the 1931 census to 954, still all Muslims, in a total of 213 houses.

In the 1945 statistics the population was 1,280, all Muslims,  while the total land area was 30,933 dunams, according to an official land and population survey. Of this, 1,299  were allocated  for plantations and irrigable land, 7,341 for cereals, while 30 dunams were classified as built-up (urban) areas.

1948-1967
In the wake of the 1948 Arab–Israeli War, and after the 1949 Armistice Agreements, Rantis came under Jordanian rule.

Israeli raid

A report by Major General Vagn Bennike, Chief of Staff of the United Nations Truce Supervision Organization, to the United Nations Security Council read:
On 28–29 January 1953 Israeli military forces estimated at 120 to 150 men, using 2-inch mortars, 3-inch mortars, P.I.A.T. (projectors, infantry, anti-tank) weapons, bangalore torpedoes (long metal tubes containing an explosive charge), machine-guns, grenades and small arms, crossed the demarcation line and attacked the Arab villages of Falameh and Rantis. At Falameh the mukhtar was killed, seven other villagers were wounded, and three houses were demolished. The attack lasted four and a half hours. Israel was condemned for this act by the Mixed Armistice Commission.Attacks on West Bank village Qibya, Gaza Bureij camp – UNTSO report (Bennike), SecCo debate, SecGen statement – Verbatim record

In 1961, the population of Rantis was 1,539.

Post-1967
After the Six-Day War in 1967,  Rantis has been under Israeli occupation. The population in the 1967 census conducted by the Israeli authorities was 897, 27 of whom originated from Israeli territory.

After the 1995 accords, about 12% of the village land was classified as Area B, while the remainder 88% was classified as Area C. According to ARIJ, Israel has confiscated village land to be used for bypass roads for Israeli settlements. The Israeli West Bank barrier will extend for 4 km on Rantis village land, and leave 1,815 dunams (16.6%) of the village land behind the barrier.

References

Bibliography

 

 (pp. 179–181)

 
  

  
    

 (p. 414)

External links
Welcome To Rantis
Rantis, Welcome to Palestine
Survey of Western Palestine, Map 14:    IAA, Wikimedia commons 
Rantis Village (Fact Sheet),  Applied Research Institute–Jerusalem (ARIJ)
Rantis Village Profile, (ARIJ)
Rantis aerial photo,  (ARIJ)
Rantis.org

Villages in the West Bank
Ramallah and al-Bireh Governorate
Municipalities of the State of Palestine